David Laury III (born April 9, 1993) is an American professional basketball player who is currently a free agent. He played college basketball for Lamar State and Iona before playing professionally in the NBA G League, Puerto Rico and Israel.

High school career
Laury attended Nia Prep School where as a senior, he helped lead coach Vincent Robinson's squad to a 26-6 overall mark.

College career
Laury began his college career at Lamar State where as a freshman, he averaged 16.2 points and 9.8 rebounds per game while shooting nearly 60% from the field and posted 14 double-digit point efforts and eight double-doubles.

As a sophomore, Laury transferred to Iona where he averaged 20.1 points and 9.5 rebounds per game as a senior, second in both categories in the MAAC. For that, he was named the MAAC Player of the Year. He led Iona to a regular season MAAC championship and had 16 double-doubles.

Professional career
After going undrafted in the 2015 NBA draft, Laury signed with Yeşilgiresun Belediye of the Turkish Basketball League on June 28, 2015. He later left the team prior to the start of the regular season and returned to the United States. On October 31, he was selected by the Delaware 87ers with the eighth overall pick in the 2015 NBA Development League Draft. On March 2, 2017, Laury was traded to the Windy City Bulls.

On August 5, 2017, Laury signed with the Israeli club Maccabi Ashdod for the 2017–18 season. On October 29, 2017, Laury recorded 22 points, shooting 8-for-10 from the field, along with 11 rebounds and 3 assists in an 86–74 win over Hapoel Jerusalem. Two days later, Laury was named co-Israeli League Round 4 MVP, alongside his teammate Sek Henry.

On October 21, 2018, Laury was added to the training camp roster of the Windy City Bulls of the NBA G League. He did not make the final roster.

On November 24, 2019, Laury returned to Israel for a second stint, signing with Hapoel Tel Aviv for the rest of the season. However, four days later, he parted ways with Hapoel due to personal reasons.

The Basketball Tournament
David Laury played for Gael Nation in the 2018 edition of The Basketball Tournament. In 2 games, he averaged 15 points, 6.5 rebounds, and 2 blocks per game. Gael Nation reached the second round before falling to Armored Athlete.

Personal life
Laury majored in Mass Communications.

References

External links
Iona Gaels bio

1990 births
Living people
American expatriate basketball people in Israel
American men's basketball players
Baloncesto Superior Nacional players
Basketball players from New Jersey
Delaware 87ers players
Iona Gaels men's basketball players
Junior college men's basketball players in the United States
Maccabi Ashdod B.C. players
Power forwards (basketball)
Sportspeople from East Orange, New Jersey
Windy City Bulls players